Little Metigoshe State Recreation Area is a smaller unit of the North Dakota state park system located on the east shore of Lake Metigoshe in the Turtle Mountains near the international border between Canada and the United States. The area offers picnicking, fishing dock, and wintertime access to ice fishing. It lies one half mile west of the entrance to Lake Metigoshe State Park, a 1,500-acre facility that offers a full menu of recreational activities.

References

External links
Little Metigoshe State Recreation Area North Dakota Parks and Recreation Department

State parks of North Dakota
Protected areas of Bottineau County, North Dakota